In is an uncommon Korean family name and an element in Korean given names. Its meaning differs based on the hanja used to write it.

Family name
As a family name, In may be written with one hanja, meaning "mark" or "seal" (도장 인). It has two bon-gwan: Kyodong, which is an island in Incheon and Yonan, North Korea. The 2000 South Korean census found 20,635 people with this family name. In a study by the National Institute of the Korean Language based on 2007 application data for South Korean passports, it was found that 86.9% of people with this surname spelled it in Latin letters as In in their passports. Alternative spellings (the remaining 13.1%) included Yin and Ihn.

People with this family name include:
In Jae-keun, South Korean democracy activist
In Gyo-jin (born 1980), South Korean actor
In Joon-yeon (born 1991), South Korean footballer

Given name
There are 29 hanja with the reading "in" on the South Korean government's official list of hanja which may be registered for use in given names; they are listed in the table at right.

People with the single-syllable given name In include:
Song In (died 1126), Goryeo Dynasty male civil official
Hwangbo In (died 1453), Joseon Dynasty male civil official
Kim In (1943–2021), South Korean male Go player
Lee In (volleyball) (born 1952), South Korean male volleyball player
Lee In (actor) (born 1984), South Korean male actor
Cui Ren (Korean name Choe In, born 1989), Chinese football player of Korean descent

One name containing this element, In-sook, was the 8th-most popular name for newborn South Korean girls in 1950. Names containing this element include:

First syllable
In-hye (feminine)
In-sik (masculine)
In-soo (unisex)
In-sook (feminine)
In-young (unisex)

Second syllable
Ga-in (feminine)
Hye-in (feminine)
Jae-in (unisex)

See also
List of Korean family names
List of Korean given names

References

Korean-language surnames
Korean given names